John Francis Conlan (21 May 1928 – 3 December 2004) was an Irish Fine Gael politician, grocer and publican. He was elected to Seanad Éireann in 1965 on the Industrial and Commercial Panel. He was elected to Dáil Éireann as a Fine Gael Teachta Dála (TD) at the 1969 general election for the Monaghan constituency. He was re-elected at each subsequent general election (for Cavan–Monaghan from 1977) until he lost his seat at the  1987 general election.

Conlan was also a member of Monaghan County Council from 1955 until 1999 and was its chairman on two occasions. He was also a member of Ballybay Town Commissioners from 1950 until 1991 and served as chairman of that body for many years. In addition, he was election agent for James Dillon while Dillon was the Fine Gael TD for Monaghan in the 1950s.

Conlan's son Seán Conlan served as a TD from 2011 to 2016.

See also
Families in the Oireachtas

References

1928 births
2004 deaths
Fine Gael TDs
Members of the 11th Seanad
Members of the 19th Dáil
Members of the 20th Dáil
Members of the 21st Dáil
Members of the 22nd Dáil
Members of the 23rd Dáil
Members of the 24th Dáil
Politicians from County Monaghan
Local councillors in County Monaghan
Fine Gael senators